This is a list of awards and nominations received by Somali-American actor and director Barkhad Abdi. He made his debut in the film Captain Phillips (2013). He won a BAFTA and was also nominated for an Academy Award, Golden Globe and Screen Actors Guild Award.

Major associations

Academy Awards

BAFTA Awards

Golden Globe Awards

Screen Actors Guild Awards

Other awards and nominations

Alliance of Women Film Journalists

Awards Circuit Community Award

Black Reel Awards

Capri Awards

Critics' Choice Movie Awards

Central Ohio Film Critics Association

Chicago Film Critics Association

Dallas–Fort Worth Film Critics Association

Denver Film Critics Society

Detroit Film Critics Society

Georgia Film Critics Association

Empire Awards

Gold Derby Award

Houston Film Critics Society

London Film Critics' Circle

MTV Movie Awards

National Society of Film Critics

Online Film Critics Society

San Francisco Film Critics Circle

St. Louis Gateway Film Critics Association

References

External links
 

Abdi, Barkhad